Willem Coertzen (born 30 December 1982, in Nigel) is a South African track and field athlete who competes in the decathlon. He was the silver medallist in the event at the African Championships in Athletics in 2008. He is the current South African national record holder in the event with his score of 8343.

Athletics career 
He began taking part in decathlon competitions in 2007 for Shaftesbury Barnet Harriers in the United Kingdom, where he won the South of England Combined Events Championship in Bedford with a total of 7245 points. The following year he returned to his native South Africa to win his first national decathlon title, then recorded a personal best of 7721 points in Réduit. A month later at the 2008 African Championships in Athletics in Addis Ababa, he took the silver medal in the decathlon behind Algeria's Larbi Bouraada and also managed a bronze medal in the pole vault event with a modest clearance of 4.00 m. He underwent a groin operation in November that year, leading him to miss the following year's national championships.

The following May he completed two decathlons: he set a new South African record in the event with a score of 7907 points for third place at the Multistars meeting in Desenzano del Garda. Although he was eleventh at the 2009 Hypo-Meeting in Götzis later that month, he improved his record further with a total of 8054 points, clearing the 8000-point mark for the first time in his career. He was selected to represent his country at the 2009 World Championships in Athletics and he significantly improved upon his past marks. Reflecting upon his performance of 8146 points in the men's decathlon in Berlin, he said: "Six personal bests out of 10 events, 14th in the world, and a new national record - who could be unhappy with that?".  One of these personal bests was in the pole vault, which he achieved after an incident where his pole snapped in three places during a jump.

He competed sparingly in 2010, but returned to international competition the following year. He edged out Olympic medallist Dmitriy Karpov at the TNT - Fortuna Meeting in June 2011, taking third place with a score of 8094 points (which included personal bests in the discus throw, shot put and 1500 metres). He improved his national record to 8244 points at the 2012 South African Championships, setting bests in the pole vault, 1500 m, and javelin throw.

He came a close second to Damian Warner at the 2013 Decastar meeting, finishing with 8118 points (including a 2.08 m personal best in the high jump).

At the 2014 Commonwealth Games, he competed in the decathlon, where he competed in the first four events before pulling out before the start of the 400 metres.

Statistics

Personal bests

References

External links

1982 births
Living people
People from Nigel, Gauteng
South African decathletes
Athletes (track and field) at the 2012 Summer Olympics
Athletes (track and field) at the 2016 Summer Olympics
Olympic athletes of South Africa
Athletes (track and field) at the 2014 Commonwealth Games
World Athletics Championships athletes for South Africa
Sportspeople from Gauteng
Commonwealth Games competitors for South Africa